Margot Mahler (1948–1997) was a German film and television actress. She appeared in a number of sex comedies during the 1970s.

Selected filmography
 Angels of the Street (1969)
 When You're With Me (1970)
 The Mad Aunts Strike Out (1971)
 Holiday Report (1971)
 Who Laughs Last, Laughs Best (1971)
 The Disciplined Woman (1972)
 Don't Get Angry (1972)
 How Sweet Is Her Valley (1973)
 The East Frisian Report (1973)
 Blue Blooms the Gentian (1973)

References

Bibliography
 Pym, John. Time Out Film Guide. Penguin Books, 2002.

External links

1948 births
1997 deaths
German film actresses
German television actresses
People from Straubing